Beyond the Reach is a 2014 American thriller film directed by Jean-Baptiste Léonetti and written by Stephen Susco. It is based on the 1972 novel Deathwatch by Robb White and stars Michael Douglas, Jeremy Irvine, Hanna Mangan-Lawrence, and Ronny Cox.

The film premiered at the 2014 Toronto International Film Festival under its original title The Reach, and was released in the United States on April 17, 2015, by Roadside Attractions.

Plot
Ruthless tycoon and trophy collector John Madec flaunts his $500,000 all-terrain vehicle in a small Mojave desert town, buying off the local sheriff to bag an endangered desert bighorn sheep. The sheriff solicits the young but experienced tracker Ben to guide Madec an hour outside of town into the canyon country of Shiprock. Madec taunts Ben over his girlfriend, who has gone away to Colorado on a college swimming scholarship after being gifted a gun that Ben taught her to shoot. When Ben asks to see the permit to hunt the endangered bighorn, Madec offers a wad of cash, which the stunned Ben begrudgingly accepts.

When Madec—with a shoot-first-and-ask-questions-later philosophy—accidentally shoots an old prospector, Ben insists that they must report it as an accident. Madec puts another bullet from Ben's gun into the corpse, and after explaining how he can now blackmail Ben with questions of who was the actual killer, offers Ben a deal: Madec will put him through college with a finance major and give him a $300,000 dollar-a-year job in return for his complicity in covering up the crime.

When Ben picks up his emergency transponder, Madec destroys it and berates Ben for breaking the deal. Madec then threatens Ben with his high-powered rifle and orders him to strip off his clothes and shoes, forcing him to wander out in the desert, 45 miles from the nearest town, to die of dehydration and exposure. Madec plans to report that Ben went mad, shot the prospector, and wandered off into the barren horizon alone. To ensure his story is not contradicted, Madec watches Ben from a distance, using the scope from his rifle. Ben hides in the dead prospector's subterranean lair, but Madec blows it up with the prospector's dynamite stash. Before it explodes, Ben escapes with a 'treasure map' belonging to Charlie, whom Ben vows will not die without justice. Ben finds enough water inside of a barrel to survive. Madec shoots the barrel.

By sunset, Ben uses the map to find a wrist-brace slingshot and some marbles amongst a buried box of Charlie's personal effects. Ben heads for a hidden grotto of water that he and his girlfriend had swum in, only to find it dried up as his sun-burnt body now freezes in the desert night. Madec keeps watch with his vehicle's high-powered floodlights. Ben eventually outsmarts Madec to overcome him with the slingshot.

Back in town, Madec escapes from police custody during a bathroom break to board a helicopter that he solicited using his one phone call. Ben goes to his girlfriend and promises not to leave her side again. An armed Madec sneaks into their house as Ben and his girlfriend sleep and confronts them, but Ben's girlfriend shoots Madec using the same gun Ben gave to her. Madec is then killed by Ben.

Cast
 Michael Douglas as John Madec
 Jeremy Irvine as Ben
 Ronny Cox as Sheriff J. Robb
 Hanna Mangan-Lawrence as Laina
 Patricia Bethune as Secretary 
 Martin Palmer as Charlie
 David Garver as Ben's father

Production
On September 7, 2013, Michael Douglas and Jeremy Irvine joined the cast of the film, then titled The Reach. Filming began on September 13, 2013, in Farmington, New Mexico.

Release
The film premiered at the 2014 Toronto International Film Festival on September 6, 2014. The next day, Roadside Attractions bought the distribution rights to the film for $2 million. In February 2015, the film's trailer was released, revealing its new title, Beyond the Reach. Roadside Attractions released the film in the United States in theaters and on video on demand on April 17, 2015.

Critical reception
The film received mixed reviews from critics. On Rotten Tomatoes, the film has a rating of 36%, based on 69 reviews, with a rating of 4.95/10. The site's critical consensus reads, "Beyond the Reach promises goofy genre pleasures, but fails to deliver, losing the viewer—and a villainous turn from Michael Douglas—in a misguided story that stumbles to the finish." On Metacritic, the film has a score of 33 out of 100, based on 18 critics, indicating "generally unfavorable reviews".

Kyle Smith of the New York Post gave the film a half a star out of four, saying "Beyond the Reach fails to achieve the Southwestern-noir potency of No Country for Old Men, but there's no denying it brings to mind another Southwestern classic about malicious pursuit: the Road Runner cartoons." Bill Goodykoontz of The Arizona Republic gave the film two out of five stars, saying "Beyond the Reach is a misfire, one of those movies that never quite rises to the level of guilty pleasure. Michael O'Sullivan of The Washington Post gave the film one and a half stars out of four, saying "There are goofy, primal pleasures to be had in the first two-thirds of the film. But Beyond the Reach exceeds even its humble grasp in the final act, collapsing in a clatter of blockheaded manhunter-movie cliches." Tirdad Derakhshani of The Philadelphia Inquirer gave the film two out of four stars, saying "There's not much here: The characters are paper-thin, and the action is slow, at times agonizingly so."

Linda Barnard of the Toronto Star gave the film three out of four stars, saying "Douglas is in his element and the throwback, stylized look of the production makes Beyond the Reach an entertaining hit of escapist fun." Gary Goldstein of the Los Angeles Times gave the film a negative review, saying "Beyond the Reach is a grueling, unsatisfying thriller that fails the logic test in spectacular ways. Joe Neumaier of New York Daily News gave the film one out of five stars, saying "This film, though, lacks any spine. Director Jean-Baptiste Léonetti isn’t sure if he’s making a Hemingway-lite faceoff or a hemmed-in horror flick."

References

External links
 
 
 
 

2014 films
2010s survival films
2014 psychological thriller films
2014 thriller drama films
American psychological thriller films
American survival films
American thriller drama films
Films about bullying
Films based on works by Robb White
Films based on American thriller novels
Films produced by Michael Douglas
Films set in deserts
Films shot in New Mexico
Murder in films
Roadside Attractions films
2010s English-language films
2010s American films